Gamochaeta americana is a plant in the genus Gamochaeta, also known as American everlasting and Gnaphalium americanum.

References

americana
Plants described in 1768